The 1992 United States presidential election in Texas took place on November 3, 1992, as part of the 1992 United States presidential election. Voters chose 32 representatives, or electors to the Electoral College, who voted for president and vice president.

Texas was won by incumbent President George H. W. Bush (R-Texas) with 40.56% of the popular vote over Governor Bill Clinton (D-Arkansas) with 37.08%. Businessman Ross Perot (I-Texas) finished in third, with 22.01% of the popular vote. Clinton ultimately won the national vote, defeating Bush. He thereby became the first Democrat to win a presidential election without Texas since its statehood in 1845. Despite Bush's ties to the state, this is the closest since 1976 that Texas has come to voting for a Democratic presidential candidate. It has since become a cornerstone of the Republican electoral coalition. 1992 was the first election in which Texas provided the Republican nominee with his largest raw vote margin in the nation, a distinction the state held in every subsequent election until 2020, when Texas's raw vote margin was exceeded by Tennessee's. While Texas had last voted for a losing candidate in a presidential election in 1968, when it voted for Democrat Hubert Humphrey, it has subsequently gone on to do so by voting for losing Republican nominees Bob Dole in 1996, John McCain in 2008, Mitt Romney in 2012, and Donald Trump in 2020.

Texas was one of the few states in the U.S. where Ross Perot won any counties, namely Irion, Somervell, Grayson, and Loving. Perot was the first third-party candidate to win any Texas counties since George Wallace in 1968. , this is the last time these four aforementioned counties have not voted Republican, and the last time a third-party candidate won any of Texas's counties. Loving County, which was the country's least populous in 1992, gave Perot his best performance in the country, earning 46.88% of the vote. In contrast, and more typically in modern American politics, Starr County was Clinton's strongest outside the District of Columbia, and one of only two to give him over 80% of the vote, the other being Macon County, Alabama, while the Panhandle counties of Hansford and Ochiltree were the third and fourth-strongest for Bush nationwide, behind the famous bastions of Jackson County, Kentucky, and Sioux County, Iowa. 

Clinton remains the last Democratic candidate to carry the following counties: Crockett, Concho, McCulloch, Coleman, Mills, Throckmorton, Briscoe, Hill, Freestone, Henderson, Jack, Clay, Montague, Franklin, Lamar, Upshur, Angelina, Hardin, Liberty, Madison, Polk, San Jacinto, and Houston. Hays County, which Clinton won in 1992, would not vote Democratic again until 2020.

Results

Results by county

See also
 United States presidential elections in Texas
 Presidency of Bill Clinton

Notes

References

Texas
1992
1992 Texas elections